The men's 20 kilometres walk event at the 1999 Pan American Games was held on July 26.

Results

References

Athletics at the 1999 Pan American Games
1999